Thomas Francis Evers  (1852–1925) was a professional baseball player who primarily played second base in the American Association for the 1882 Baltimore Orioles and for the 1884 Washington Nationals of the Union Association. He is the uncle of Johnny Evers and Joe Evers.

External links

1852 births
1925 deaths
Baltimore Orioles (AA) players
Washington Nationals (UA) players
Major League Baseball second basemen
Baseball players from New York (state)
19th-century baseball players